Tengra (also spelled as Tangra) is a village and a gram panchayat in Bangaon CD Block in Bangaon subdivision of North 24 Parganas district, West Bengal, India.

Geography
Villages in Tengra gram panchayat are: Arshingri, Dhoramari, Shutia and Tengra. Tengra is about 8 km from Bangaon.

Demographics
As per the 2011 Census of India, Tengra had a total population of 4,226, of which 2,184 (52%) were males and 2,042 (48%) were females. Population below 6 years was 354. The total number of literates in Tengra was 3,371 (87.06% of the population over 6 years).

Transport
A short stretch of local road links Tengra to State Highway 3 at Ganrapota.

References

Villages in North 24 Parganas district